Molly Caitlyn Quinn (born October 8, 1993) is an American actress who has worked in theatre, film, and television. Her roles include Alexis Castle, daughter of the title character on ABC's Castle, and the voice of Bloom, one of the main characters in the Nickelodeon revival of Winx Club.

Life and career
Molly Quinn was born in Texarkana, Texas. She began taking weekly acting lessons from director and producer Martin Beck after performing in a community production of The Nutcracker at age six. In the sixth grade, she auditioned at the Young Actors Studio, and after six months of "intensive [acting] training", signed with the Osbrink agency and Management 360.

From 2009 to 2016, she starred in the ABC mystery drama series Castle as Alexis Castle, the lead character's daughter.

From 2011 to 2015, Quinn performed the lead role of Bloom in Nickelodeon's revival of the animated series Winx Club. At first, Quinn tried a "cartoony" voice for her character. Nickelodeon advised her to use her real voice instead, saying, "No, we want voices of real girls this time around." Quinn also voiced Bloom in the re-records of the first and second films based on the series.

In March 2014, Quinn appeared as the voice of the sentient computer Fey, in the episode "Numbers" of the podcast series Welcome to Night Vale.

Filmography

Awards

References

External links

 
 

21st-century American actresses
Actresses from Texas
American child actresses
American film actresses
American stage actresses
American television actresses
American voice actresses
Living people
People from Texarkana, Texas
1993 births